The Federation of European Laboratory Animal Science Associations is a pan-European stakeholder organisation, representing common interests in the furtherance of laboratory animal science in Europe and beyond. The organisation was founded in 1978 and is an umbrella organisation for European national or multinational associations.

Members
, the federation consisted of 22 member associations, representing 29 countries.
Association Française des Sciences et Technique de l'Animal de Laboratoire
Associazione Italiana per Scienze degli Animali da Laboratorio
Asociatia Romana pentru Stiinta Animalelor de Laborator
Baltic Laboratory Animal Science Association
Belgian Council for Laboratory Animal Science
Czech Laboratory Animal Science Association
Croatian Laboratory Animal Science Association
Dutch Association for Laboratory Animal Science
Gesellschaft für Versuchstierkunde
Georgian Association for Laboratory Animal Science 
Hungarian Laboratory Animal Science Association
Hellenic Society of Biomedical and Laboratory Animal Science
Israeli Laboratory Animal Forum
Laboratory Animal Science Association (United Kingdom)
Polish Laboratory Animal Science Association
Russian Laboratory Animal Science Association
Scandinavian Society for Laboratory Animal Science
Schweizerische Gesellschaft für Versuchstierkunde
Slovenian Association for Laboratory Animals
Sociedad Española para las Ciencias del Animal de Laboratorio
Sociedade Portuguesa de Ciências em Animas de Laboratório
Türkiye Laboratuvar Hayvanları Bilimi Derneği (Turkey)

External links

Animal testing
International scientific organizations based in Europe